Santa Catarina de Tepehuanes is a locality of Tepehuanes Municipality in Durango, Mexico.

It is the municipal seat of the municipality.

References

Populated places in Durango